Heading for a Storm is the second studio album by the Dutch hard rock band Vandenberg, released in 1983 on Atco Records.

Cover art 
This cover art has a highway in a desolate desert and large sharks flying on the road. The painting on the album cover was made by guitarist Adrian Vandenberg.

Commercial performance 
In the Netherlands, the preceding single "Differential Worlds" ranked up to 17th on the single chart, and the work entered the top 50 in the eighth week of the album chart and ranked 14th over two weeks. In addition, the entered the Oricon LP chart for the first time in Japan and entered the top 100 groups in six weeks, ranking 71st.

On the other hand, in the U.S., it was not as successful as its previous work, ranked 169th on the Billboard 200, and when it comes to singles, "Friday Night" ranked 29th on the Billboard mainstream rock chart.

Track listing 
Music and lyrics by Adrian Vandenberg

Side one
 "Friday Night" - 3:37
 "Welcome to the Club" - 3:30
 "Time Will Tell" - 3:48
 "Different Worlds" - 4:36

Side two
"This Is War" - 4:01
 "I'm on Fire" - 4:18
 "Heading for a Storm" - 4:03
 "Rock On" - 4:05
 "Waiting for the Night" - 4:27

Personnel

Band members
Bert Heerink – lead vocals, backing vocals
Adrian Vandenberg – guitars, keyboards, backing vocals, producer, mixing, cover design
Dick Kemper – bass guitar, bass pedals, backing vocals 
Jos Zoomer – drums, backing vocals

Production
Stuart Epps - producer, engineer
Bob Ludwig - mastering at Masterdisk, New York

References

External links 
 

1983 albums
Vandenberg (band) albums
Atco Records albums